Corps of Military Police may refer to:
Royal Australian Corps of Military Police
Corps of Military Police (India)
Corps of Indian Military Police, in British India
Corps of Royal New Zealand Military Police
Sri Lanka Corps of Military Police
The former name of the Royal Military Police of the British Army
Pakistan Army Corps of Military Police

See also
Military Police Corps (disambiguation)